Carl Malmberg (June 26, 1904 – February 6, 1979) was an American public health educator, translator and writer.

Biography

Malmberg was born in Oshkosh, Wisconsin. He was the son of Anton Martin and Kirsten Marie Malmberg. He was educated at Lawrence University (1921-1923) and Columbia University (1924-1927). He was editor of the Health and Hygiene magazine (1936-1938). He was a managing supervisor for the American Optometric Association (1938-1939). He married Elizabeth Newhall on January 10, 1940.

In the 1940s Malmberg was a Public Relations Advisor, Information Specialist for United States Public Health Service and Chief Investigator for U. S. Senate Subcommittee on Health and Education. He was a writer for the Democratic National Committee (1945-1946).

Malmberg translated many articles and books from Danish, Norwegian, and Swedish. He was a member of the American Translators Association and the New Hampshire Historical Society.

He wrote fiction novels under the pseudonym Timothy Trent.

Diet and Die

In 1935, Malmberg authored Diet and Die, a book critical of fad diets. The book criticized dietary fads, pseudo-scientific nutrition claims and quack remedies. Malmberg critically examined the ideas of fasting, naturopathy, vegetarianism, low-protein diets, Gayelord Hauser's Eliminative Feeding System, Hay diet, mucusless diet and many others.

A review in the Journal of the American Medical Association concluded that "the book may well be recommended by all physicians to patients who are interested in being disillusioned relative to the fallacies that recur again and again in the field of nutrition." The American Journal of Clinical Pathology, commented that "this excellent expose of fads and fadists who have plied their trade on the unsuspecting public is well worth reading. Physicians can do a real service for their patients by seeing that they procure a copy of it."

A 1937 review in The Philippine Journal of Science described the book as a "startling revelation of the different diet fads and medicinal frauds that are now found in the market... In this book one will find many popular diets in vogue in America, criticized severely and their inconsistencies and dangers clearly presented."

Publications

Nonfiction
Diet and Die (New York: Hillman-Curl Inc, 1935)
140 Million Patients: The Revealing Facts Behind Health and Medical Care in America (New York: Reynal & Hitchcock, 1947)
America is Also Scandinavian (New York: G. P. Putnam's Sons, 1970)
Warner, New Hampshire 1880-1974 (Warner Historical Society, 1974)

Fiction (as Timothy Trent) 
Night Boat (Godwin, 1934).
All Dames are Dynamite (Godwin, 1935)
Fall Guy (Godwin, 1936)

Translations

Leif Panduro. (1961). Kick Me in the Traditions. Eriksson.
Carl Erik Soya. (1961). Seventeen. Eriksson.
Jacob Paludan. (1966). Jorgen Stein. University of Wisconsin Press.
Leif Panduro. (1967). One of Our Millionaires Is Missing. Grove.
Tom Kristensen. (1968). Havoc. University of Wisconsin Press.
Jens Kruuse. (1968). War for an Afternoon. Pantheon.
Jens August Schade. (1969). People Meet. Dell.

References

1904 births
1979 deaths
20th-century American male writers
20th-century American non-fiction writers
20th-century American translators
American health educators
American health and wellness writers
American male non-fiction writers
American skeptics
Columbia University alumni
Critics of alternative medicine
Critics of vegetarianism
Danish–English translators
Lawrence University alumni
Norwegian–English translators
People from Oshkosh, Wisconsin
Swedish–English translators
United States Public Health Service personnel
Writers from Wisconsin